Lydia Lunch: The War Is Never Over is a 2019 documentary film about musician Lydia Lunch. It was directed by New York underground filmmaker Beth B.

References

External links
Home
Lydia Lunch: the War Is Never Over (2019)

2019 documentary films
2019 films
American documentary films
Documentary films about punk music and musicians
2010s American films